Leskovec nad Moravicí (formerly also Špachov) is a municipality and village in Bruntál District in the Moravian-Silesian Region of the Czech Republic. It has about 400 inhabitants. It lies on the shore of Slezská Harta Reservoir.

Administrative parts
The village of Slezská Harta is an administrative part of Leskovec nad Moravicí.

History
The village of Leskovec was founded in 1224.

References

Villages in Bruntál District